Chen Shizhong may refer to:

Chen Shih-chung (born 1953), Taiwanese politician
John Chen Shi-zhong (1917–2012), Chinese Roman Catholic bishop